The Texian Army, also known as the Revolutionary Army and Army of the People, was the land warfare branch of the Texian armed forces during the Texas Revolution. It spontaneously formed from the Texian Militia in October 1835 following the Battle of Gonzales. Along with the Texian Navy, it helped the Republic of Texas win independence from the Centralist Republic of Mexico on May 14, 1836 at the Treaties of Velasco. Although the Texas Army was officially established by the Consultation of the Republic of Texas on November 13, 1835, it did not replace the Texian Army until after the Battle of San Jacinto.

Organization
When Mexico gained its independence from Spain in 1821, the former Spanish province of Texas became part of the Mexican state Coahuila y Tejas. For the first time, the government of Texas encouraged immigrants from the United States to settle its lands. By 1834, an estimated 30,000 English speakers lived in Texas, compared to only 7,800 of Spanish heritage. The bankrupt Mexican government was unable to offer Texas much military support. Many of the settlements had created small militias to protect themselves against raids by Indian tribes.

Under President Antonio López de Santa Anna the government of Mexico began to drift towards a more centralist form. In 1835 Santa Anna revoked the Constitution of 1824 and began reigning as a dictator. In various parts of the country federalists revolted.

In September 1835, Colonel Domingo Ugartechea, the military commander of the Mexican forces at San Antonio de Bexar set troops to recover a small cannon that had been given to the Texian Militia of Gonzales for protection. When the Mexican troops, under Lieutenant Francisco de Castañeda, reached Gonzales, Texian commander Captain Albert Martin convinced the troops to wait for several days. Martin then sent messengers to other English-speaking settlements, asking for reinforcements to help protect the cannon.

Within several days, militias from Fayette County and Columbus arrived. In Gonzales, the Texian Militias combined to form the Texian Army and chose John Henry Moore as their captain, Joseph Washington Elliot Wallace as a lieutenant colonel, and Edward Burleson as major. The first military action taken by the new army was the Battle of Gonzales on October 2, 1835. After a skirmish, the Mexican troops withdrew to San Antonio, leaving the cannon with the Texians.   After the battle ended, disgruntled colonists continued to assemble in Gonzales, eager to put a decisive end to Mexican control over the area. The Committee of Safety at San Felipe named the gathering "The Army of the People."

Within a week, the men had taken the Mexican post at Goliad. On October 11, the disorganized volunteers elected Stephen F. Austin, who had settled Texas's first English-speaking colonists in 1821, as their commander-in-chief. Austin had only two months of military experience in the Missouri First Regiment of Mounted Militia under Colonel Alexander McNair, where he earned the rank of quartermaster sergeant, but he saw no combat.

Demographics
In 1836, Texas had a population of 40,000 people.   Approximately 2,000 of the citizens, around 5% of the population, served in the army at some point between October 1835 and April 1846.  Still, Historian Paul Lack argues that "for a people of such fabled militance, the Texians turned out for army duty in the period of crisis at a low rate of participation".  The army was augmented with volunteers from the United States.

Overall, 3,685 men served in the Army of the People between October 1, 1835 and April 21, 1836.  Forty percent of them had emigrated after October 1.  Of the Texians, 57.8% were residents of the Department of the Brazos, 10.4% of the Department of Bexar, and 31.7% from the Department of Nacogdoches.  Of the men who arrived in Texas after October 1, 1835, not all of these additions were American citizens; many were recent immigrants from Europe who were seeking adventure and potential riches in Texas.   Through the course of the Texas Revolution, one in seven of the English-speaking settlers in Texas joined the army.  One in three adult male Tejanos, that is, Spanish-speaking settlers in Texas, joined the army.

The composition of the army changed dramatically over time, with four distinct waves:
the army of OctoberDecember 1835, which participated in the battles of Gonzales, Goliad and the Siege of Bexar
the army from January through March 1836
the army of mid-March through April, 1836, which participated in the Battle of San Jacinto
the army of MaySeptember 1836

The early army was composed predominantly of Texas residents, with every municipality represented.  Over 1,300 men volunteered for the army in October and November 1835.  Of these, approximately 1,1001,500 were residents of Texas, with an average date of emigration of 1830.  Half of the men were married.  Roughly 51% of them came from the Department of the Brazos, an area in central Texas which consisted of the colonies established by Stephen F. Austin and Green DeWitt, as well as some of the area granted to Sterling C. Robertson.  An additional 15% of the volunteers were from the Department of Bexar, where most citizens were Tejano, and which was partially occupied by Mexican troops.  Thirty-four percent of the volunteers came from the Nacogdoches district of far East Texas, an area where homes and families were not under threat.

After the Texas victory in Bexar in early December, men began leaving the army and returning home.  By the end of February 1836, fewer than 600 men remained in the army. A total of 917 men served in the army for varying lengths of time in JanuaryMarch 1836.  In a sharp contrast from the army of a few months prior, these men were predominantly newcomers to Texas.  The overwhelming majority—78%—had arrived from the United States since the outbreak of hostilities in October.  They had an average age of 27, and almost two-thirds were single.  Of the Texians who continued to participate, 57% were from the areas most at risk of Mexican attempts to reassert control over its national territory—Bexar, Gonzales, Matagorda and Jackson—despite the small population of these areas.  When examined in the context of the political districts, 59% of the Texians were from the Brazos department and 23% from Bexar.

The army suffered significant losses at the battles of the Alamo and Coleto.  The provisional government passed conscription laws, which should have resulted in about 4,000 men joining the army.  The laws were impossible to enforce due to the fact that most citizens had fled as part of the Runaway Scrape.  By the Battle of San Jacinto on April 21, new commander Sam Houston had a total of 1,282 recruits in the army.  Of these, about 250 were ill, at camp, or on scouting missions at the time of the battle.

The average date of emigration was 1835; 21% of the men had arrived in Texas after October 1, 1835, and almost 18% had arrived between January 1 and October 1, 1835.  Approximately 60% of the soldiers were single, and their average age was 28.  In many families, the younger sons joined the army while the fathers escorted the women and younger children east, away from the advancing Mexican army.  67% of the Texians who volunteered were from the Brazos Department, an impressive number considering the heavy losses many of these areas had sustained in the March fighting.  25% were from the Nacogdoches district, fewer than had served in 1835.  Only 5% of the Texians were from the Bexar District.  This number was low both because many of the volunteers had perished at the Alamo or Coleto and because the area was now occupied by the Mexican army.  It was not only difficult for men to leave the area, but it was unwise to leave their families.  The majority of the men from Bexar who served in April were cavalry officers under the command of Colonel Juan Seguin.

An additional 623 men served in April outside of Houston's army.  Less is known about these men, who had no central command or location.  It is estimated that 31% were recent arrivals from the United States.  They were older, with an average age of 34, and over 41% of them came from the Nacogdoches district.  Historian Paul Lack described these men as a home guard, a "last line of defense" for the Texians.

398 men served in both 1835 and April 1836. Of these, 58% were single, with an average age of 30, and 26% had arrived in Texas after the war began.  Of the Texians, 63% were from the Brazos district, 11% from Bexar, and 26% from Nacogdoches.  Lack posits that many of those who chose not to re-enlist in April 1836 believed that they had done their duty.  For the most part, they were older and, as they had been in Texas longer, they had more to protect.

Believing the hostilities were over, by the end of May, most of the Texas residents had left the army, which shrank to 400 men.  With fears of a Mexican counterattack spreading, more volunteers arrived from the United States.  By June, the ranks had increased to 1300–1700 men, and by September to 2,500 men, spread across 53 companies.  Of those in the army in September, 1,800 had come to Texas after the Battle of San Jacinto.

Formation and structure
The structure of the Texian Army was relatively fluid.  Originally, it was composed entirely Texian Militia who came and went at will. To become an officer, a man must simply have had enough money or charisma to convince others to serve under him. In the first half of the Texas Revolution, many of the units and individual volunteers came from the United States. The United States volunteer units in the Army represented ten states; from New Orleans, Louisiana the New Orleans Greys, from Alabama the Red Rovers, Huntsville Rovers, and Mobile Greys, from
Mississippi the Mississippi Guards and Natchez Mustangs, from New York the 1st New York Battalion and 2nd New York Battalion and from other states the Georgia Volunteers, Kentucky Mustangs, Missouri Invincibles, North Carolina Volunteers, and Tennessee Mounted Volunteers, and Union Guards

By the end of the war, the army had grown to include three distinct divisions.  Members of the regular army enlisted for two years and were subject to army discipline and the army's chain of command.  A squad of permanent volunteers enlisted for the duration of the war.  This group was permitted to elect its own officers, outside the oversight of the army commander-in-chief.  Most of the men who joined the permanent volunteers had settled in Texas before the war had begun, both Tejano and Texians. The last unit was the volunteer auxiliary corps, comprising primarily recent arrivals from the United States who officially enlisted for a six-month term.  On November 24, 1835, the Texas provisional government authorized the creation of ranging companies of rifleman.  Robert "Three-legged Willie" Williamson was asked to raise three of these companies with 56 men each. Rangers were to be paid $1.25 per day.

Republic Army

Texian regular army and permanent volunteer units
Texas Rangers (paramilitary unit)
Infantry (militia)
Mounted Volunteers (militia)
Mounted Gunmen (militia)
Mounted Riflemen (militia)
Spies (militia)
Ranging Corps. (militia)
Mounted Rangers (militia)
Army
Minute Men (militia)
Juan Seguín's Mexican Tejano Volunteers (militia)

United States volunteer auxiliary corps units
Alabama Red Rovers (Alabama Volunteers) (Courtland, Alabama)
Georgia Battalion (Georgia Volunteers) (Macon, Georgia)
Huntsville Rovers (Huntsville, Alabama)
Kentucky Mustangs
Mississippi Guards
Missouri Invincibles
Mobile Greys (Alabama Volunteers) (Mobile, Alabama)
Natchez Mustangs (Natchez, Mississippi)
New Orleans Greys (New Orleans, Louisiana)
1st New York Battalion
2nd New York Battalion
North Carolina Volunteers
Tennessee Mounted Volunteers (Tennessee Volunteers)
Union Guards (?)

Texian Army flags

Notable Texian Army commanders and officers

Notable soldiers
John M. Allen (soldier), first mayor of Galveston
Moseley Baker, member of Alabama Congress; member of the Republic of Texas Congress
Gail Borden, inventor of process for condensed milk and namesake of Borden's Milk
Andrew Briscoe, signer of the Texas Declaration of Independence, first judge of Harris County, Texas
Benjamin F. Bryant, founder of the Bryant Station frontier fort and Texas Ranger
Henry Eustace McCulloch, Texas Ranger; brigadier general Confederate States of America
William Whitaker Reed
Elijah Sterling Clack Robertson, empresario, postmaster of the Republic of Texas
Joel Walter Robison
Juan Seguín, signer of the Texas Declaration of Independence, namesake of Seguin, Texas
Deaf Smith, headed company of Texas Rangers, namesake of Deaf Smith County, Texas
Martin Varner

Uniforms, weapons, and equipment
Neither the regular nor volunteer components of the Texian Army were issued specific uniforms.  Several of the companies that formed in the United States, including the New Orleans Greys, purchased U.S. Army surplus uniforms before they arrived.  Other companies had more loosely defined "uniforms", such as wearing matching hunting shirts.

Texian volunteer Noah Smithwick wrote a description of the volunteer army as it looked in October 1835:

Words are inadequate to convey an impression of the appearance of the first Texas army as it formed in marching order. ... Buckskin breeches were the nearest approach to uniform and there was wide diversity even there, some of them being new and soft and yellow, while others, from long familiarity with rain and grease and dirt, had become hard and black and shiny. ... Boots being an unknown quantity, some wore shoes and some moccasins. Here a broad brimmed sombrero overshadowed the military cap at its side; there, a tall "beegum" rode familiarly beside a coonskin cap, with the tail hanging down behind, as all well regulated tails should do ... here a bulky roll of bed quilts jostled a pair of "store " blankets; there the shaggy brown buffalo robe contrasted with a gaily colored checkered counterpane on which the manufacturer had lavished all the skill of dye and weave known to art ... in lieu of a canteen, each man carried a Spanish gourd.... Here a big American horse loomed above the nimble Spanish pony, there a half-broke mustang pranced beside a sober methodical mule. A fantastic military array to a casual observer, but the one great purpose animating every heart clothed us in a uniform more perfect in our eyes than was ever donned by regulars on dress parade.

History

Offensive maneuvers (October – December 1835)

Several days after Austin took command, the army marched towards Bexar to confront General Martin Perfecto de Cos, who had recently arrived to command the remaining Mexican troops in Texas.

Restructuring (December 1835 – February 1836)

The regular division of the Army was officially established on December 12. Those who joined the volunteer auxiliary corps would receive  of land if they served two years, while those who served 1 year would receive . A month later the establishment of a Legion of Cavalry would be authorized.

The commander of the regular forces, Sam Houston, called for 5,000 men to enlist in the regular army but had difficulty convincing men to join.  Many of the arrivals from the United States did not want to be under a more strict military control, and instead informally joined the volunteer units that had gathered in other parts of Texas. These volunteer soldiers were in many cases more impassioned than the Texas settlers.  Although the provisional Texas government was still debating whether the troops were fighting for independence or for separate statehood, on December 20, 1835, the Texian garrison at Goliad voted unanimously to issue a proclamation of independence, stating "that the former province and department of Texas is, and of right ought to be, a free, sovereign and independent state".

The provisional government had originally placed Houston in charge of the regular forces, but in December the council gave secret orders to James Fannin, Frank W. Johnson, and Dr. James Grant to prepare forces to invade Mexico.  Houston was then ordered to travel to East Texas to broker a treaty that would allow the Cherokee to remain neutral in the conflict. Johnson and Grant gathered 300 of the 400 men garrisoned in Bexar and left to prepare for the invasion.

The government was woefully short of funds.  On January 6, 1836, Colonel James C. Neill, commander of the remaining 100 troops in Bexar, wrote to the council: " there has ever been a dollar here I have no knowledge of it. The clothing sent here by the aid and patriotic exertions of the honorable Council, was taken from us by arbitrary measures of Johnson and Grant, taken from men who endured all the hardships of winter and who were not even sufficiently clad for summer, many of them having but one blanket and one shirt, and what was intended for them given away to men some of whom had not been in the army more than four days, and many not exceeding two weeks."

For the next several months it was unclear who was in charge of the Texian army—Fannin, Johnson, Grant, or Houston.  On January 10, Johnson issued a call to form a Federal Volunteer Army of Texas which would march on Matamoros during the Matamoros Expedition.

Defensive maneuvers (March – April 1836)
The Mexican army returned to Texas in February and initiated a siege of the garrison in San Antonio on February 23.  The commander at the Alamo, William B. Travis, sent numerous letters to the Texas settlements, begging for reinforcements. Men began to gather in Gonzales to prepare to reinforce the garrison.  Before they left, the Mexican army launched the Battle of the Alamo, and all of the Texian soldiers who had been stationed in Bexar were killed.  This left two branches of the Texian Army: Fannin's 400 men at Goliad and Neill's 400 men at Gonzales, who soon reported to Houston. On hearing the news of the massacre at the Alamo, Houston ordered his army to retreat and burned the town of Gonzales as they left.  He ordered Fannin to bring his men and join the rest of the army. Fannin's force was defeated at the Battle of Coleto Creek, and on March 27 Fannin and his men were executed at the Goliad Massacre.  A few soldiers escaped, and 80 soldiers who had just arrived from the United States and had no weapons were spared.

As news spread of the defeats at the Alamo and Goliad, men flocked to the Texian army.  By early April, Houston commanded about 800 men.  The Texas Revolution essentially ended on April 21, when the Texian Army routed a Mexican force and captured Santa Anna at the Battle of San Jacinto.

For six months David G. Burnet, ad interim President of the Republic, had diligently maintained the army laws set forth by the Consultation in December 1835. The 1835–36 Regular Army of Texas would never consist of more than 100 soldiers and would never approach the Consultation's number goal of  560 infantry, 560 artillery and 384 cavalry, in the permanent "Regular Army" of Texas. However, the goal of independence was achieved, nonetheless.

Retention as permanent defensive force for the Republic of Texas (1836–1845)

In media 

 1960: The Alamo, a feature film based on the Battle of the Alamo. Depicts Texas Rangers and Texian Army.
 2004: The Alamo, a feature film based on the Battle of the Alamo. Depicts Texas Rangers and Texian Army.
 2015: Texas Rising, a 10-hour miniseries based on the Texas Revolution. Depicts Texas Rangers and Texian Army.
 2018: The Men Who Built America: Frontiersmen ("Empire or Liberty"), an episode based on the Battle of the Alamo. Depicts Texas Rangers and Texian Army.

See also

 Texas Military Forces
 Texas Military Department
 List of conflicts involving the Texas Military
 Awards and decorations of the Texas Military

Notes

References

Sources

External links
 Flags of Texas Independence
 Texas Army – Uniforms of the Republic of Texas (Texas Military Forces Museum.org)

Armies by country
Disbanded armies
Military units and formations established in 1835
Texas Revolution
Republic of Texas
Texas Ranger Division
Texas Military Department
Texas Military Forces